Alzahra University (Dāneshgāh-e Alzahrā) is a female-only public university in the Vanak neighborhood of Tehran, Iran. Alzahra University is the only comprehensive women's university in Iran and the Middle East. Acceptance to the university is competitive and entrance to undergraduate and graduate programs requires scoring among the top 1% of students in the Nationwide University Entrance Exams. Alzahra University is ranked second in Iran and 201–300 in the world, according to University Impact Rankings 2019, Times Higher Education (THE). Alzahra University ranked number 17 in Iran and number 801+ worldwide according to the physical sciences subject ranking, World University Rankings 2019 by Times Higher Education.

History and profile
The university, founded by Queen Farah Pahlavi in 1964, began as a private institution under the title of the Higher Educational Institute For Girls with 90 students. After the Iranian revolution, the university attained public status, and was renamed Mahboubeh Mottahedin after an Iranian Revolutionary who was killed prior to the 1979 revolution. In 1983 the university was renamed Alzahra University. The university offers 51 undergraduate, 83 graduate, and 31 post-graduate programs to 10,000 students.  The university has ten faculties and a research center for women's studies, as well as a branch in the city of Urmia (the capital of West Azerbaijan province) and two self-supporting campuses.

The faculties of Alzahra University are Art, Biological Sciences, Education and Psychology, Engineering and Technology, Literature and Languages, Mathematical Sciences, Physical Education, Physics and Chemistry, Social and Economic Sciences, and Theology.
  
The university initiated its graduate studies program in 1990, under the supervision of Vice Chancellery for Academic Affairs, by establishing an Educational Psychology master's degree program and admitting 11 students. It then established five fields and admission of 36 students in 1993. In 1994 the Graduate Studies Affairs was established and commenced its mission with 158 students in eight master's degree fields. The first PhD examination was administered in the major of Islamic History in the same year.

The university offers doctoral programs in history (Islamic history and history of Islamic Iran), psychology, economics, research in art, chemistry, physics, and applied mathematics.

Faculty members
The academic faculty of the university is a community of some 350 tenured scholars teaching and conducting research. The professors work in collaboration with visiting colleagues from other Iranian universities.

Collaborations with other universities
Alzahra University is a member of the International Association of Universities (IAU) and the Federation of Universities of the Islamic World (FUIW), and has established close ties and signed more than 45 Memoranda of Understanding (MoUs) for academic-research collaborations with accredited universities and research centers worldwide from a variety of countries, such as Pakistan, Iraq, Germany, Uganda, France, Russia, India, Kyrgyzstan, China, the Philippines, Indonesia, Syria, Libya, Belarus, among others.

Facilities
Alzahra University has central and faculty libraries with 77,000 hard copies of books (33,000 of which are in English), and 930 Persian and English academic journals. Among other facilities offered at Alzahra University are electronic libraries, professional laboratories, language labs, computer labs, an art gallery, an educational center, business incubators, pool and sports facilities, food centers and a traditional Iranian restaurant, whose building dates back to over 120 years.  A post office, bank, travel agency office, cellphone services office, grocery store, stationery shop/bookstore and copy place are on campus

Department and research centers
Department of physical education and sport sciences 
Department of literature, language and history
Department of physics and chemistry
Department of biological sciences
Department of mathematics
Department of social sciences and economics
Department of engineering
Department of psychology
Department of theology
Department of art
Department of psychology
Women research center

Campuses
Alborz campus
International campus
Urmia branch

Research and publications
Eighteen academic journals are published by the university, such as Journal of Applied Biology, Journal of Brand Management, Women's Sociological and Psychological Studies, Women and Family Studies, Applied Physics, Historical Perspective & Historiography, History of Islam and Iran, Language Research, and many more.  6,000 theses and dissertations reside in the Central Library of the university.

International students
The university offers its undergraduate, graduate and postgraduate programs to international students. Around 128 international students study at Alzahra University, from Afghanistan, Pakistan, Iraq, Lebanon, Nigeria, Turkey, Syria, Tajikistan, and Tanzania. Some of the facilities for international students are:
 Offering Persian language courses at the university Persian Language Center
 Offering some courses in English upon popular demand
 Insurance
 On-campus dormitory
 Access to all amenities of the university and dormitory, equaling the access of Iranian students. These include, among others:
 Swimming pool
 Sports complex
 Computer labs and free Wi-Fi access
 Student clubs
 General and professional libraries
 Counseling services 
 Participation and membership in sport competitions, socio-cultural gatherings, and productive, entertaining, and cultivating student events

Alzahra University in Ranks 

Ranked 601–800 for Engineering and Technology in Times Higher Education Ranking 2020

Ranked 557 for Natural Sciences and 371 for Technical Sciences in Round University Ranking 2019

Ranked 201 in Times Higher Education University Impact Ranking 2019

Ranked 68  in UI Green Metric 2018

Notable people 

 Poopak Niktalab, graduated in mathematics, author and literary researcher

References

External links
 Official website of Alzahra University

 
1964 establishments in Iran
Educational institutions established in 1964
Women's universities and colleges
Women's rights in Iran